Robert Weil is an Executive Editor and Vice President of the publishing imprint W.W. Norton / Liveright. From 2011 to 2022 he was the Editor-in-Chief and Publishing Director of Liveright, succeeded by Peter J. Simon in July, 2022.

Early life and career
Weil graduated from Yale College with a B.A. in History in 1977, and originally considered teaching high school before beginning his publishing career with Times Books in 1978 as an Editorial Assistant. Two and a half years later he moved to the former Omni Magazine. With Omni Magazine he introduced a book division and packaged and agented science books to publishers before becoming Senior Editor at St. Martin's Press in 1988, a division of Macmillan Publishers. Weil's acquisitions included Michael Wallis's Route 66, Henry Roth’s tetralogy of novels called The Mercy of a Rude Stream, Oliver Stone’s autobiographical novel A Child’s Night Dream, and John Bayley’s Elegy for Iris.

W.W. Norton & Company / Liveright Publishing
In 1998, Weil moved to W.W. Norton & Company as an Executive Editor. His acquisition of most of the Patricia Highsmith backlist, which included several new volumes, in 1999, helped launch the Highsmith renaissance in the U.S. and the 2015 film Carol starring Cate Blanchett and Rooney Mara, based on the novel The Price of Salt, as well as Highsmith's diaries, published in 2021. Weil also worked for several years with Paul McCartney (and Paul Muldoon) on the editing of McCartney's book The Lyrics: 1956 to the Present, published in 2021.

In 2011, Weil was named the Editor-in-Chief and Publishing Director of Liveright Publishing Corporation. Per a 2021 profile in Publishers Weekly, "The relaunched imprint released its first books in 2012. It started with two full-time staffers and a list of about 20 books per year, and has grown to eight staffers and about 40 books annually." During Weil's tenure as Editor-in-Chief, Liveright received four Pulitzer Prizes (among nine finalists) as well as a National Book Award (among eight nominees). The current staff of Liveright includes Peter Miller, Dan Gerstle, Nick Curley, Cordelia Calvert, Gina Iaquinta, Haley Bracken, and Zeba Arora.

Additional work
Beyond editing, Weil frequently lectures on writing, publishing history, and the state of American culture and literature. He has spoken in Munich, Guadalajara, Miami, Chicago, and at Yale University, Vanderbilt University, and the University of Nebraska, among others.  He has also written on books and publishing for various publications including The Washington Post and ArtForum.

Selected authors edited by Robert Weil

Selected works edited by Robert Weil

References

External links
Ronald Collins, An Interview with Robert Weil, Washington Independent Review of Books (April 5, 2016)
Virtual Memories Show 261: Robert Weil
 Robert Weil on Publishing Tinderbox
Robert Weil on Publishing Nelson Mandela's Letters from Prison
Liveright to Publish Nelson Mandela's Prison Letters
An Interview with Robert Weil
Liveright Publishing Corporation
Robert Weil on publishing German literature
Liveright and Robert Weil to Publish The Complete Works of Primo Levi
Michael Dirda discusses the Complete Works of Primo Levi and Robert Weil's publishing career
C-SPAN BookTV interview with Robert Weil
Frank B. Wilderson III on his book Afropessimism and working with Robert Weil

American book editors
Year of birth missing (living people)
Living people
Yale College alumni